Ceroprepes is a genus of snout moths. It was described by It was described by Zeller in 1867.

Species
 Ceroprepes atribasilaris Du, Song & Yang, 2005
 Ceroprepes fartakensis (Rebel, 1931)
 Ceroprepes fusconebulella Yamanaka & Kirpichnikova, 2000
 Ceroprepes guizhouensis Du, Li & Wang in Du, Li & Wang, 2002
 Ceroprepes jilongensis Du, Song & Yang, 2005
 Ceroprepes lunata Du, Song & Yang, 2005
 Ceroprepes naga Roesler & Küppers, 1979
 Ceroprepes nigrolineatella Shibuya, 1927
 Ceroprepes ophthalmicella (Christoph, 1881)
 Ceroprepes patriciella Zeller, 1867
 Ceroprepes proximalis Walker, 1863
 Ceroprepes pulvillella (Zeller)
 Ceroprepes walterzeissi Roesler, 1983

References

Phycitinae
Taxa named by Philipp Christoph Zeller
Moth genera